Hamid Ekrem Šahinović (1879/1882 – 30 December 1936) was a Bosnian writer and dramatist. He was editor of Muslimanska svijest, a Bosnian-language newspaper supporting the Young Turks political reform movement, and Novi Behar, the 1920s revival of the Bosnian Muslim political magazine Behar.

Šahinović was born in either 1879 or 1882 in the hamlet Hum near Foča, Bosnia and Herzegovina, during Ottoman rule over the country. He completed gymnasium in Sarajevo, then pursued a high education in Zagreb and Vienna. Although Šahinović died 30 December 1936, his year of death is sometimes mistakenly given as 1939.

References

19th-century births
1936 deaths
People from Foča
Bosniaks of Bosnia and Herzegovina
Bosnia and Herzegovina writers
Bosniak writers